Titi Horsfall is a Nigerian author. She is a recipient of the African Literature Prize from African Achievers Awards.

Biography 
She has a bachelor's degree in marketing, a masters in banking and finance, and an MBA in oil and gas management from the Robert Gordon University, Aberdeen.

Horsfall received the award for African Literature Prize from African Achievers Awards in 2016. She was of the international authors at the London Book Fair in 2016.

Selected works 
 Orphan to a Queen, 2012
 Influence of a King, 2015

References 

Living people
Nigerian women writers
Year of birth missing (living people)
Alumni of Robert Gordon University